Aran is a village and municipality in the Shaki Rayon of Azerbaijan. It has a population of 467.

References

Populated places in Shaki District